The Geomori ('land-sharers') were a group in a number of archaic Greek cities:
 Geomori (Athens), an obscure group in pre-Solonian Athens (7th century BC);
 Geomori (Samos), who ruled Samos in the early 6th century BC and possibly before; 
 Geomori (Syracuse), who ruled Syracuse until c. 485 BC.